Silent Scr3am is the first studio album by Greek gothic metal band Elysion, released on December 21, 2009 by Massacre Records.

In 2008 the Elysion separated their paths with Maxi Nil under good faith, and Christianna was the next frontwoman. Then they entered the studio for the recordings of debut album, which soon attracted the attention of numerous record labels, leading in signing up with Massacre Records. In the next months Elsyion completed mixing and mastering of the album with American producer engineer Ted Jensen on his owned Sterling Sound Studios.

The cover of the album is created by Natalie Shau; the artwork and photos of the booklet is a creation of Seth Siro Anton. Elysion promoted the album by touring Europe (including Greece) and North America.

Reception

Silent Scr3am received positive reviews in Germany. The Sonic Seducer lauded singer Christianna's powerful voice as well as the guitar riffs, but wrote also that the band had still to find its own style. The German edition of Metal Hammer called it a "potential sensation" although the tracks were not found to be innovative.

Track listing

Credits

Band members 
Petros Fatis - drums
Johnny Zero - guitars, keyboards
FXF - bass
Christiana "Christianna" Hatzimihali - female vocals

Guest/session musicians 
Renos Miliaris - Piano (additional) on tracks 4 and 10

Crew 
Natalie Shau - cover art
Maxi Nil - lyrics
Spiros Antoniou - photography
Mark Adrian - producer, mixing
Ted Jensen - mastering
Nick Jackson - logo

References 

2009 debut albums
Elysion (band) albums
Albums with cover art by Spiros Antoniou